Wielka Wieś  is a village in the administrative district of Gmina Główczyce, within Słupsk County, Pomeranian Voivodeship, in northern Poland.

Before 1648 the area was part of Duchy of Pomerania, 1648–1945 Prussia and Germany. For the history of the region, see History of Pomerania.

The village has a population of 460.

References

Villages in Słupsk County